Milton Township is a civil township of Antrim County in the U.S. state of Michigan. The population was 2,204 at the 2010 census.

Communities 
Elgin was the name of a post office in this township from 1875 until 1881.
Grand Traverse Band of Ottawa and Chippewa Indians occupies a small territory within Milton Township.
The Kewadin post office with ZIP code 49648 also serves large portions of Milton Township and Torch Lake Township. The Kewadin post office opened June 4, 1883.

Geography

Demographics
As of the census of 2000, there were 2,072 people, 850 households, and 651 families residing in the township. The racial makeup of the township was 96.33% White, 0.05% African American, 2.27% Native American, 0.19% Asian, 0.68% from other races, and 0.48% from two or more races. Hispanic or Latino of any race were 1.59% of the population.

There were 850 households, out of which 27.3% had children under the age of 18 living with them, 68.0% were married couples living together, 6.1% had a female householder with no husband present, and 23.3% were non-families. 20.2% of all households were made up of individuals, and 9.1% had someone living alone who was 65 years of age or older.  The average household size was 2.42 and the average family size was 2.77.

In the township the population was spread out, with 21.9% under the age of 18, 4.5% from 18 to 24, 22.7% from 25 to 44, 30.4% from 45 to 64, and 20.5% who were 65 years of age or older.  The median age was 46 years. For every 100 females, there were 102.3 males.  For every 100 females age 18 and over, there were 97.1 males.

The median income for a household in the township was $44,890, and the median income for a family was $50,568. Males had a median income of $37,578 versus $23,942 for females. The per capita income for the township was $26,817.  About 3.2% of families and 5.0% of the population were below the poverty line, including 4.9% of those under age 18 and 1.5% of those age 65 or over.

References

Notes

Sources

External links
Milton Township official website

Townships in Antrim County, Michigan
Townships in Michigan
Michigan populated places on Lake Michigan